A destructive and deadly outbreak of 17 tornadoes occurred on February 9–10, 1959, mostly during the overnight hours, causing widespread destruction in the Midwest and Southeast regions of the United States. The strongest of the outbreak was a violent F4 tornado which tore through Northwestern Downtown St. Louis. An F3 tornado also caused heavy damage to numerous structures in Southern Highland County, Ohio, including a school that was in session at the time the tornado hit. Overall, the outbreak caused 21 fatalities (all in St. Louis), 358 injuries, and $53.713 million in damage. Non-tornadic impacts also caused two more fatalities, and at least 70 more injuries.

Meteorological synopsis
Early on February 7, a low-pressure system formed over Southeastern Oregon. This low strengthened as it moved slowly southeastward over the next two days before bottoming out at 992 mbars over Southwestern Colorado. It then accelerated tremendously as it turned eastward and then east-northeastward across the Central Plains. Meanwhile, an unusual surge of warm weather entered the Midwest in Early-February with temperatures climbing into the 60s across the region. The low-pressure system entered the area on February 9, spawning multiple clusters of severe thunderstorms over the Southern Great Plains. These storms would remain severe and tornadic throughout the overnight into the next day as the low-pressure moved quickly through the Great Lakes region.

Confirmed tornadoes

February 9 event

February 10 event

Crescent–Northwestern Downtown St. Louis, Missouri/Madison, Illinois

This catastrophic and violent F4 tornado first touched down in the southwest corner of St. Louis County in Crescent, Missouri just southwest of Sherman. The tornado first caused some minor damage to homes in Sherman, as it moved northeast before passing through Jedburg and Cedar Bluff. Damage continued to be minor as the tornado struck Mountain Ridge, Lincoln Beach, Fern Glen, Southern Twin Oaks, Barretts, and Ozark View. As the tornado entered Warson Woods, it began to intensify sharply and damage became much more severe as it reached F2 status. Homes and stores had their roofs ripped off and numerous trees and power lines were downed. Similar to worse destruction was seen in Rock Hill, Brentwood, and Maplewood. Throughout St. Louis County, the tornado killed 10, injured 170, and caused $25 million in damage.

The tornado then entered St. Louis City, devastating the area. It first damaged dozens of buildings and homes in the neighborhoods of Franz Park, Hi-Pointe, and Clayton-Tamm in Northern Benton before tearing part of the roof off the St. Louis Arena and blowing down a TV tower in Northern Gratiot. It then reached its peak intensity as it tore through Forest Park and into the Central West End, Vandeventer, Covenant Blu-Grand Center, and Jeff Vanderlou neighborhoods in Northwestern Downtown St. Louis, where widespread F3 and isolated F4 damage was observed. Many brick apartments and family restaurants at Olive St. and Boyle Ave. suffered major damage. A block away, multiple homes were heavily damaged or destroyed along Whitter St., including some that were leveled. A destroyed three-story house at the corner of Whitter St. and Delmar Blvd. saw its lower floors completely collapse, causing the attic to completely cave in on the structure while remaining largely intact. Eight people were killed at this location. More buildings were wrecked along Sarah St. and an apartment building along North Prairie Ave. lost its entire rear wall, leaving it open like a doll house. The tornado continued to wreak havoc as it swept through the St. Louis Place, Hyde Park, and Near North Riverfront neighborhoods. Numerous other buildings along with automobiles, trees, and power lines were damaged or destroyed with debris littering the streets and hundreds of people trapped in the rubble of the collapsed buildings. Throughout St. Louis, the tornado killed 11, injured 175, and caused $25 million in damage.

The tornado then weakened and crossed the Mississippi River into Brooklyn, Illinois near the McKinley Bridge in St. Clair County. Minor to moderate damage was inflicted to several factory buildings. The tornado then crossed into Madison County and through Southern Venice, doing some additional damage before dissipating east of Madison and south of Granite City. Damage in Illinois was estimated at $250,000 and no casualties occurred here. Some additional minor damage also occurred south of Edwardsville, but this was most likely unrelated to the tornado.

There was also some evidence that supports this possibly being a twin-funneled event as well. Over 2000 buildings were damaged or destroyed, including 16 homes that were destroyed and over 100 others that sustained major damage. 345 people were injured and 21 others were killed, making it the third deadliest tornado in the city's history. Interestingly, a severe thunderstorm warning had been in effect for this storm, but forecasters did not see enough evidence in their World War II-vintage radar to issue a tornado warning, especially since this was during the Winter months, which proved to be a fatal mistake.

Sugar Tree Ridge–Northern Belfast, Ohio

The last tornado to be strong as well as cause casualties first touched down just to the west of Sugar Tree Ridge and quickly reached its peak intensity as it moved eastward directly into the tiny town. About 12 farms incurred damage, including one that saw all its buildings leveled, the house catch fire, and a car thrown  into a ditch and destroyed. A garage at another home was ripped off its foundation and tossed into the backyard mostly intact while another house with four occupants was leveled, although everyone escaped with only minor injuries. The tornado remained strong as it passed south of Folsom, before roaring into Northern Belfast. The Belfast school, which was in session at the time of the tornado, sustained heavy damage to its roof, walls, and windows. Two children were injured when a brick chimney fell through the roof of an occupied classroom, scattering debris all over the place. Cars were demolished and more utility lines were downed and severed in the area as well. Dozens of farm buildings were damaged or destroyed before the tornado weakened and dissipated southwest of North Uniontown.

Six people were injured and losses totaled $250,000. The tornado may have traveled slightly farther than indicated as more damage was reported downwind after the tornado supposedly dissipated.

Non-tornadic impacts
The massive storm system bought widespread impacts to much of the Central United States. At least 20 reports of strong thunderstorms winds and hail came from this system. Prior to the tornadoes, heavy thunderstorms dropped  of rain in the Greater St. Louis area, flooding basement and streets. One man was killed after drowning in flood waters in Alton, Missouri.

Snow, sleet, and freezing rain impacted all of Iowa between February 9-15. Widespread damage occurred, especially an areas that had a glaze of ice from the freezing rain, where power and telephone lines were downed. Hundred of personal injury and property damage falls and traffic accidents were reported, causing one fatality and 70 injuries.

Aftermath
The St. Louis F4 tornado destroyed 47 homes and buildings, caused major damage to 245 others, and inflicted minor damage to 1,633 more. This left almost 1,400 people were homeless after the storm. The tornado came so quickly and unexpectedly that emergency responders were very slow in realizing the extent of the disaster, which occurred at around 2 am CST, when most people were sleeping after a long-day of already rough weather. The Weather Bureau did not receive its first report of serious damage until 2:38 am CST, over 20 minutes after the tornado had lifted. Communications following the tornado were complicated as many utility wires were downed, so the city's Civil Defense agency was not called in until about 4 am CST. Many people were trapped under the debris from the buildings and rescuers worked throughout the night to save them. In the days following the disaster, citizens donated $240,000 to the Red Cross.

The tornado also bought about a new inquiry for tornado sirens. Despite the casualties and damages caused by the tornado, the Weather Bureau stood by their decision to not issue a tornado warning and even if one had been issued, the city's defense sirens would not have sounded because they were to be used to alert the area of air-raid strikes, not for weather warnings (this was very common during the Cold War era). It was not until another deadly outbreak in 1967 produced another F4 tornado that killed three in the same general area that tornado sirens were finally installed.

The F3 tornado in Southern Highland County, Ohio injured and killed multiple farm animals and downed over 100 power lines in Sugar Tree Ridge alone. In Belfast, the Belfast School was damaged so severely that school officials dismissed all of the classes immediately. The school also sustained extensive roof damage, and with more bad weather forecasted to hit the area in the days following the disaster, emergency workers worked late into the night that Tuesday to make hurried repairs on the buildings.

See also
List of North American tornadoes and tornado outbreaks
List of tornadoes striking downtown areas
St. Louis tornado history
Tornado outbreak sequence of May 1896
1896 St. Louis–East St. Louis tornado
Tornado outbreak sequence of April 19–24, 2011
2011 St. Louis tornado

Notes

References

Tornadoes of 1959
F4 tornadoes
Tornadoes in the United States
Tornadoes in Missouri
Tornadoes in Oklahoma
Tornadoes in Kansas
Tornadoes in Illinois
Tornadoes in Indiana
Tornadoes in Kentucky
Tornadoes in Ohio
Tornadoes in Georgia (U.S. state)
History of St. Louis